Eoophyla waigaoalis is a moth in the family Crambidae. It was described by Charles Swinhoe in 1900. It is found on Waigiu.

References

Eoophyla
Moths described in 1900